Grevillea aurea, commonly known as golden grevillea or Death Adder Gorge grevillea, is a species of flowering plant in the family Proteaceae and is endemic to the Northern Territory in Australia. It is a tall, open shrub leaves that have nine to twenty-seven lobes or teeth, and flowers that are red at first, becoming orange-red to yellow as they age.

Description

Taxonomy
Grevillea aurea was formally described in 1993 by Peter M. Olde and Neil R. Marriott in the journal Telopea from specimens collected in Death Adder Gorge by Donald McGillivray and Clyde Robert Dunlop in 1978. The specific epithet (aurea) means "golden".

Distribution and habitat
Golden grevillea grows in heath, scrub and forest understorey on sandstone escarpments and ridges in three separate parts of Kakadu National Park in the Northern Territory.

References

aurea
Proteales of Australia
Flora of the Northern Territory
Plants described in 1993